Thynnichthys polylepis is a species of cyprinid of the genus Thynnichthys. It inhabits Sumatra and Borneo. Described in 1860 by Pieter Bleeker, it is considered harmless to humans.  it has not been classified on the IUCN Red List.

References

Cyprinid fish of Asia
Freshwater fish of Indonesia
Fish described in 1860